Kateřina Siniaková defeated Elena Rybakina in the final, 6–7(4–7), 7–6(7–5), 6–4 to win the singles tennis title at the 2022 WTA Slovenia Open. It was her first singles title since 2017.

Jasmine Paolini was the defending champion, but lost to Siniaková in the quarterfinals.

Seeds

Draw

Finals

Top half

Bottom half

Qualifying

Seeds

Qualifiers

Lucky loser 
  Harriet Dart

Qualifying draw

First qualifier

Second qualifier

Third qualifier

Fourth qualifier

Fifth qualifier

Sixth qualifier

References

External links 
 Main draw
 Qualifying draw

2022 WTA Tour